Shashi P. Karna (born 1956) is a nanotechnology physicist for the United States Army Research Laboratory in Aberdeen, Maryland. He was named a Fellow of the American Physical Society in 2006.

Educational background
Karna was born in Bihar, India in 1956.[1] He received his Ph.D. (1983) and an M.Sc. (1976) degrees in chemistry from Banaras Hindu University. He received his B.Sc. (1973) degree in mathematics, physics, and chemistry from Bhagalpur University in India. He has authored over 300 articles, including refereed technical papers, conference proceedings, reviews, and book chapters. He has co-edited a few books, not only but including "DoD Applications of Nano-materials."[2][3][4][5]

Career
Karna is a senior research scientist (ST) of nano-functional materials at the Army Research Laboratory, Weapons & Materials Research Directorate, Aberdeen Proving Ground, Maryland. He has led the ARL Nanoscience Strategic Technical Initiative (2006–2008) and also served as the chair of the Nanotechnology area at the Army Science Conference (2006, 2008), American Physical Society Symposium on Molecular Electronics (2003, 2005), American Chemical Society Symposium on Nonlinear Optical Materials (1994, 2001), Materials Research Society Symposium on Optical Materials (1999, 2003), Nanomaterials – (2004, 2007) and as a technical program committee member of the Institute of Electrical and Electronics Engineers (IEEE) NANO (2001 – present). He serves as the chair of the NATO Sensors and Electronics Technology Research Technical Group on "Smart Textiles." He also acts as a member of the external advisory board of Michigan Technological University, Mechanical Engineering and Engineering Mechanics Department and the Department of Energy, Office of Energy Basic Research, Energy Frontiers Research Centers (FERC) Review Panel. He holds adjunct professors at the State University of New York, Buffalo, Michigan Technological University, and Morgan State University.

Books authored and co-authored
 Nonlinear Optical Materials
 Defense Applications of Nanomaterials
 Nonlinear Optical Materials: Theory and Modelling
 Organic and Nanocomposite Optical Materials: 2004 MRS Fall Meeting Symposium Proceedings, Vol. 846

Professional memberships and affiliations
 Fellow, American Physical Society, 2006
 Fellow, United States Army Research Laboratory
 Fellow, The Optical Society, 2004
 Senior Member, Institute of Electrical and Electronics Engineers, Elected 2000
 Member, American Chemical Society
 Member, American Association for the Advancement of Science

Recent publications
 Karrea PSK, Bergstrom PL, Mallick G, et al. Room temperature operational single electron transistor fabricated by focused ion beam deposition Journal of Applied Physics 102 (2): Art. No. 024316 July 15, 2007
 Gowtham S, Scheicher RH, Ahuja R, et al. Physisorption of nucleobases on graphene: Density-functional calculations Physical Review B 76 (3): Art. No. 033401 July 2007
 He HY, Pandey R, Karna SP Electronic structure mechanism of spin-polarized electron transport in a Ni-C-60-Ni system Chemical Physics Letters 439 (1–3): 110–114 May 4, 2007
 Dunlap BI, Karna SP, Zope RR Dipole moments from atomic-number-dependent potentials in analytic density-functional theory Journal of Chemical Physics 125 (21): Art. No. 214104 December 7, 2006
 Pineda AC, Karna SP (Hyper)polarizabilities of isolated GaN nanoclusters Chemical Physics Letters 429 (1–3): 169–173 September 29, 2006
He HY, Pandey R, Karna SP Theoretical study of molecule mediated spin-polarized electron tunneling between magnetic materials Chemical Physics Letters 428 (4–6): 411–415 September 20, 2006
He HY, Pandey R, Pati R, et al. Spin-polarized electron transport of a self-assembled organic monolayer on a Ni (111) substrate: An organic spin switch Physical Review B 73 (19): Art. No. 195311 May 2006
Lau KC, Pandey R, Pati R, et al. Theoretical study of electron transport in boron nanotubes Applied Physics Letters 88 (21): Art. No. 212111 May 22, 2006
Lastella S, Mallick G, Woo R, et al. Parallel arrays of individually addressable single-walled carbon nanotube field-effect transistors Journal of Applied Physics 99 (2): Art. No. 024302 January 15, 2006
Pati R, Pineda AC, Pandey R, et al. Ab initio quantum chemical study of electron transfer in carboranes Chemical Physics Letters 406 (4–6): 483–488 May 2, 2005

References

Living people
Indian nanotechnologists
Indian emigrants to the United States
1956 births
People from Aberdeen, Maryland
Fellows of the American Physical Society
20th-century Indian engineers
Scientists from Bihar
University at Buffalo faculty
Tilka Manjhi Bhagalpur University alumni